Tonkinese is a domestic cat breed produced by crossbreeding between the Siamese and Burmese. Members of the breed share many of their parents' distinctively lively, playful personality traits and are similarly distinguished by a pointed coat pattern in a variety of colors. In addition to the modified coat colors of the "mink" pattern, which is a dilution of the point color (as in watercolors), the breed is now being shown in the foundation-like Siamese and Burmese colors: pointed with white and solid overall (sepia). 

The best known variety is the short-haired Tonkinese, but there is a medium-haired (sometimes called Tibetan) which tends to be more popular in Europe, mainly in the Netherlands, Germany, Belgium, Luxembourg and France.

History

It is believed that Tonkinese-like cats have existed in the West since at least the early 19th century. The founder of the American Burmese type, a female named Wong Mau imported to the United States in 1930, is thought to have been genetically a crossbreed of this type. (Wong Mau was actually a Tonkinese, though the "breed" was not recognized as such at the time. Some of today's Tonkinese can be tracked by pedigree back to Wong Mau).

More modern Tonkinese cats are the result of the crossbreeding programs of two breeders working independently of each other. Margaret Conroy, of Canada, and Jane Barletta, of the United States, crossed the Siamese and Burmese breeds, with the aim of creating the ideal combination of both parent breeds' distinctive appearance and lively personalities. The cats thus produced were moved from crossbreed classification to an established breed in 2001. The name is a reference to the Tonkin region of Indochina, though it is suggestive only, as the cats have no connection with the area. 

In the West, Tonkinese cats under the age of sixth months have historically been referred to as "small-cats" rather than "kittens" to reflect a more direct translation from Burmese, although this term has become almost obsolete since the mid-20th century.

More recent historical data is detailed in the CFA Breed Profile (see below.)

Description

Appearance

Tonkinese are a medium-sized cat, considered an intermediate type between the slender, long-bodied modern Siamese and British Burmese and the more "cobby", or substantially-built American Burmese. Like their Burmese ancestors, they are deceptively muscular and typically seem much heavier than expected when picked up. Tail and legs are slim but proportionate to the body, with distinctive oval paws. They have a gently rounded, slightly wedge-shaped head and blunted muzzle, with moderately almond-shaped eyes and ears set towards the outside of their head. The American style is a rounder but sculpted head with a shorter body and sturdier appearance to reflect the old-fashioned Siamese and rounded Burmese from which it was originally bred in the United States. While many American breeders avoided using the extreme "contemporary" Burmese in favor of the more moderate "traditional" Burmese, the original Tonkinese breed standard was based on the extreme spherical style of the Burmese descended from Wong Mau. Newer Tonkinese breeders wanted to avoid defective genes in the original Burmese lines, so avoided using cats they believed carried the so-called lethal genes. A very few older breeders simply worked around the problem by selective breeding, thereby eliminating problematic births. It is possible to find some descendants by knowledgeably reading Tonkinese pedigrees, which are available in Tonkinese databases.

Coat and color

Tonkinese are currently officially recognized by the Cat Fanciers' Association (CFA) in four base colors: natural (a medium brown), champagne (a paler buff-beige), blue, and platinum. Some European associations also accept red, cream, caramel, apricot and tortoiseshell, cinnamon and fawn. TICA (The International Cat Association) has always accepted all of the colors and patterns, as they are not a selective association, like CFA, whose breeds and colors are determined by its breed councils and the executive board. TICA breeds, their colors and patterns, are genetically-based. While both of these major organization have rules for acceptance and advancement of breeds, TICA adheres to a scientific approach based on genetics, while CFA relies on its breed council membership to determine a breed's merits. Thus Tonkinese in CFA are limited to those colors and patterns decided upon with perhaps less objectivity.

Each of these colors is in turn divided into three types of coat pattern: "point", the classic Siamese-style dark face, ears, legs and tail on a contrasting white or cream base, and blue eyes; "solid", similar to the Burmese, in which the color is essentially uniform over the body with only faintly visible points and gold or green eyes; and "mink", a unique intermediate between the other two, in which the base is a lighter shade but still harmonious with the point color, and the eyes are a lighter blue-green, called aquamarine. They can be anywhere on the entire blue-green to green-blue spectrum. Owing to the comparatively recent development of the breed there is still some acceptable variation in these colors and patterns.

Temperament
Like both parent breeds, Tonkinese are intelligent, active, vocal and generally people-oriented cats, playful and interested in everything going on around them; however, this also means they are easily susceptible to becoming lonesome or bored. Their voice is similar in tone to the Burmese, persistent but softer and sweeter than the Siamese, similar to the gentle quacking of a duck. Like Burmese, Tonkinese are reputed to sometimes engage in such dog-like behaviors as fetching, and to enjoy jumping to great heights.

Genetics
Tonkin is a crossbreed type, with coat color and pattern wholly dependent on whether individuals carry the Siamese or Burmese gene. Breeding two mink Tonkinese cats does not usually yield a full litter of mink kittens, as this intermediate pattern is the result of having one gene for the Burmese solid pattern and one for the Siamese pointed pattern.

Colors and patterns in any litter depend both on statistical chance and the color genetics and patterns of the parents. Breeding between two mink-patterned cats will, on average, produce half mink kittens and one quarter each pointed and sepia kittens. A pointed and a sepia bred together will always produce all mink patterned kittens. A pointed bred to a mink will produce half pointed and half mink kittens, and a sepia bred to a mink will produce half sepia and half mink kittens.

References

Further reading
Susie Page; The Complete Cat Owner's Manual; Fog City Press;  (hardback, 1997)
Linda Vousden; Tonkinese Cats; TFH/Kingdom;  (hardback, 1998)
Linda Vousden; Tonkinese Cats A History; Grosvenor House Publishing;  (softback, 2010)

External links 

Allevamento Argento Vivo Tonkinesi
Canadian Cat Association: Breed Profile: Tonkinese
Tonkinese Breed Club UK: GCCF Breed Standard Tonkinese

Cat breeds
Cat breeds originating in Canada
Cat breeds originating in Thailand